The Royal Saudi Strategic Missile Force or RSSMF is the fifth branch of the Saudi Arabian Armed Forces, responsible for commissioning long-range strategic missiles. The RSSMF formerly had its headquarters in an underground command facility in Riyadh– the capital of Saudi Arabia.

The facility coordinated Saudi Arabia's advanced "Peace Shield" radar and air defense systems. In July 2013, the new RSSMF headquarters and academy buildings were officially opened by Prince Khalid bin Sultan bin Abdulaziz and current RSSMF commander Lieutenant general Jarallah Alaluwayt.

History 

The RSSMF's role has grown rapidly since Saudi Arabia and other Arab States of the Persian Gulf announced in 2009 an initiative to obtain nuclear weapons as a countermeasure to the Iranian nuclear program. King Abdullah of Saudi Arabia and Prince Turki bin Faisal Al Saud, a former Saudi intelligence chief and ambassador to Washington, both mentioned the Gulf states could acquire their own nuclear weapons as a countermeasure to Iran's.

Some experts speculate (by taking into account Saudi Arabia's financial contribution to Pakistan's nuclear weapons program) that Saudi Arabia may receive . One report by the BBC claims "it is a cash-and-carry deal for warheads, the first of those options sketched out by the Saudis back in 2003; others that it is the second, an arrangement under which Pakistani nuclear forces could be deployed in the Kingdom." 

In January 2020, the U.S. Army Corps of Engineers Middle East District contracted a joint venture of AECOM and Tetra Tech to provide architectural and engineering services for the Saudi Missile Program.

In 2021, CNN reported that satellite images indicated that Saudi Arabia was, with Chinese assistance, manufacturing solid fueled missiles of an undetermined type.

Facilities 
In total RSSMF operates 4 (probably 5) bases:

1. The Strategic Missile Force has a modern underground ballistic missile base with number 444 which was built in 1956 - the Al-Watah ballistic missile base (discovered with the help of satellite images) - in the rocky central part of Saudi Arabia, some 200 km southwest of the capital city of Riyadh. The base has a security perimeter with a checkpoint on the main road, as well as extensive storage and underground facilities. It also includes administrative buildings, two launch pads, a communications tower and seven gates leading to the underground facilities. Fortified depots for launchers lie behind the secondary checkpoint in the ravine area.

2. One more partially underground base Rawdah (Raniyya) under the number 633 lies 550 km south-west from the capital and 23 km south of city Ranyah as it stated. Tunnel across the rocky ridge has two entrances which have coordinates (21°3'13"N 49°55'2"E) and (31°3'12"N 42°62'52"E), base itself: 21°2′19.3″N 42°55′36.8″E. At the  one can clearly see  87 old  DF-3 Chinese missiles (probably for training).

Two older bases have similar characteristics, suggesting that they share the same role. Each complex has two missile garrisons (one in the North and another in the South) with another area serving housing, maintenance and administrative functions. The garrisons themselves are located a short distance away within a secured complex. The administrative and support complexes are outside the security perimeter:

3. It is the oldest (from 1988) Al Sulayyil ballistic missile base with number 922 is also known as Wadi ad-Dawasir. Al Sulayyil base was built by the Chinese and lies approximately 450 km southwest of the capital.

4. Al Jufayr (Al Hariq) base with number 811 lies approximately 70–90 km south of Riyadh located at (24.02072, 46.35154). 

5. The last unconfirmed base, Ash Shamli under the number 766, probably lies in the desert (27.26361, 40.05388) roughly 750 km north-west of the Saudi capital.

Delivery systems

See also 

 Royal Saudi Air Defense Forces
 Golden Wheel Project (Dongfeng missiles program in Saudi Arabia)

References 

Strategic
Military history of Saudi Arabia
1986 establishments in Saudi Arabia
Military units and formations established in 1986
Strategic forces